Judith Livers Brewer (born c.1949) was the first woman in the United States to become a career firefighter and the first American woman to serve as a battalion chief.

Biography 
In 1974, Brewer, then Judith Livers, joined the Arlington County Fire Department in Arlington, Virginia making her the nation's first female career firefighter. She was assigned to Fire Station 4 located in Arlington's Clarendon neighborhood.

Brewer retired in 1999 at which time she was serving at the nation's first woman battalion chief, a rank she earned after 17 years of service.

References 

People from Arlington County, Virginia
Living people
Firefighters
American firefighters
20th-century American firefighters
American fire chiefs
20th-century American women
Year of birth missing (living people)